Joseph Sieber Benner (January 3, 1872 – September 24, 1938) was an American author, New Thought writer and Representative of the Brotherhood of Christ who used the pen name "Anonymous". He was the first to introduce the Knowledge and Teachings of Impersonal Life (also known as the "I AM" Teaching) to the world in his first book, The Impersonal Life published in 1914. His other works were The Way Out, The Way Beyond, Wealth, Teacher, Brotherhood, The Way to the Kingdom, Papers (65 Lessons), etc.

Early life 

Benner was born in Akron, Ohio, USA on January 3, 1872. His father John W. Benner was a businessman. Benner attended public schools and held positions at J.F. Seiberling & Co., People's Savings Bank Company, Central Savings Bank Company, and Akron Trust Company. He was chief owner of the Akron Printing Company. Benner was also on the boards of the Firestone Tire and Rubber Company, Akron People's Telephone Company, Akron Coal Company, Globe Sign and Poster Company, Hower Building Company, Permanent Savings and Loan Company, Bannock Coal Company, and the Young Men's Christian Association. He remained an officer of the Central Savings and Trust Company for the rest of his career.

In the 1890s, while Secretary of the local YMCA, Benner was also listed as Gymnasium Director of Buchtel College in Akron, and he contributed at least one macabre illustration, titled "Murder", to The Lotus, an Intercollegiate journal published in Kansas City.

Benner married Nillie E. Stuver in 1894. Both were members of the Lutheran Church. They had one child, Mary Joyce Benner McGrath.

Spiritual writer 
According to author Jon Klimo, "by 1916, Benner said he felt he could no longer resist the growing inclination to give himself over as a vehicle to a larger presence, to let his mind be subsumed by (or co-creatively interact with) a larger Mind or Being." His book The Impersonal Life contained words Benner believed were recorded directly from God, and was first published in July 1914. Benner taught that Christ's proclaiming "I AM" indicated "the true spirit that resides in every human being." The "SUN center" was an Ohio group formed in 1920 around Benner's teachings. One of the group's practices was to "enter into the silence, stillness and peace" each day at noon. Benner also made a series of lessons called the "Inner Life Courses" he intended to develop discipline in life, discernment and the awakening of the Christ within the soul.

Benner died in 1938. According to his daughter, letters were found after his death in which he expressed devotion to God and his belief that God had chosen him as a medium.

Theory 

In his writing, Benner expresses the New Thought concept that we are all one with God, and that God endows each of us with the power to create our experiences and reality by means of sustained, believed thoughts.

His book, The Impersonal Life, is difficult for many persons who are new to the theory.  In the first chapter, Benner repeatedly uses the phrase, "I AM," to express the concept that God is inside of each one of us, doing the thinking and creating.

Benner seems to be using his first chapter as a litmus test, to drive off readers who are not committed to his premise that we are all "one with each other and with God."   He believed sustained thought has the power to create.  Benner describes the process as follows:

In other words, Benner contends that a sustained believed image, projected into the Universal Mind, has the ability to control not just one's own thoughts and behaviors -- but the thoughts and behaviors of all humanity—causing the image to ultimately become reality for the person projecting that image.

The Way Out -- Textbook on the Law of Attraction 

Benner's book The Way Out—written in 1931—is a textbook on how to use the Law of Attraction.  He describes the law as follows:  "Whatever you think and hold in consciousness as being so, out manifests itself in your body or affairs."

Benner emphasizes to take no thought, or be anxious about anything, that you wish to manifest.  He says to "stand guard continually at the door of your mind, and to let in no thoughts or feelings that you do not want to outmanifest. . . . Guard the door from every negative thought."

Influence 

Elvis Presley considered Benner's book, The Impersonal Life, to be one of his favorite books.  Elvis was introduced to the book by his hairdresser-turned-guru, Larry Geller, in 1964.

In the last 13 years of his life, Elvis gave away hundreds of copies of the book.  According to biographer, Jess Stearn, "He gave away spiritual books by the score.  It was nothing for him to buy one hundred copies of The Impersonal Life and give them away to the first one hundred people he saw." According to biographer Albert Goldman, Elvis allegedly had a copy of the book with him on the night he died.

Books 
 The Impersonal Life (1914)
 Christ in You (1918)
 The Way Out (1930) 
 The Way Beyond (1931) 
 The Way to the Kingdom (1932) 
 The Teacher (ca 1919/1920)
 Brotherhood (1927)
 Wealth (1927)
 The "Sun Papers" 65 essays on different subjects, published monthly between 1929 and 1935.
 Good and Evil (out of print)
 Receiving and Giving (out of print)
 The Great White Brotherhood (out of print)

References

External links 
 Death Certificate: Info in familysearch.org
 New Thought Library
 The Exumator : The Way to the Kingdom, Christ in You and The Way Out

1872 births
1941 deaths
American male essayists
American spiritual writers
New Thought writers